Neo-Ottomanism (Turkish: Yeni Osmanlıcılık, Neo-Osmanlıcılık) is an irredentist and imperialist Turkish political ideology that, in its broadest sense, advocates to honor the Ottoman past of Turkey and promotes greater political engagement of the Republic of Turkey within regions formerly under the rule of the Ottoman Empire, the predecessor state that covered the territory of modern Turkey among others.

Neo-Ottomanism emerged at the end of the Cold War with the dissolution of the Soviet Union, forming two distinct waves of the ideology: the first, in the early 1990s, developed by the Turkish journalist and foreign policy advisor to President Turgut Özal, Cengiz Candar; the second, associated with Ahmet Davutoğlu and his foreign policy goals of establishing Turkey as an influential power within the Balkans, Caucasia and the Middle East.

The term has been associated with Recep Tayyip Erdoğan's irredentist, interventionist and expansionist foreign policy in the Eastern Mediterranean and the neighboring Cyprus, Greece, Iraq, Syria, as well as in Africa, including Libya, and Nagorno-Karabakh. However, the term has been rejected by members of the Erdoğan Government, such as the former Foreign Minister Ahmet Davutoğlu and Parliament Speaker Mustafa Şentop.

Overview
One of the first uses of the term was in a Chatham House paper by David Barchard in 1985, in which Barchard suggested that a "Neo-Ottoman option" might be a possible avenue for Turkey's future development.  It seems also to have been used by the Greeks sometime after Turkey's invasion of Cyprus in 1974.

In the 21st century, the term has come to signify a domestic trend in Turkish politics, where the revival of Ottoman traditions and culture has been accompanied by the rise of the Justice and Development Party (Turkish: Adalet ve Kalkınma Partisi, abbreviated AKP founded in 2001) which came to power in 2002. The use of the ideology by Justice and Development Party has mainly supported a greater influence of Ottoman culture in domestic social policy which has caused issues with the secular and republican credentials of modern Turkey. These domestic ideals have also seen a revival of neo-Ottomanism in the AKP's foreign policy. Besides acting as a clear distinction between them and ardent supporters of secularism, the social Ottomanism advocated by the AKP has served as a basis for their efforts to transform Turkey's existing parliamentary system into a presidential system, favouring a strong centralised leadership similar to that of the Ottoman era. Critics have thus accused Erdoğan of acting like an "Ottoman sultan".

History

Neo-Ottomanism has been used to describe Turkish foreign policy under the Justice and Development Party which took power in 2002 under Erdoğan, who subsequently became Prime Minister. Neo-Ottomanism is a dramatic shift from the traditional Turkish foreign policy of the Kemalist ideology, which emphasized looking westward towards Europe. The shift away from this concept in Turkish foreign policy under Turgut Özal's government has been described as the first step towards neo-Ottomanism. Özal's neo-Ottomanism is characterized by a rediscovery of Turkey's multiple identities, in contrast to the unitary conception of the Kemalist republic, and by a tendency to prioritize economic aspects rather than politico-state and security logics.

Neo-Ottomanism had a basis in religious circles. Fethullah Gülen, an influential Islamic leader, looks both to personal transformation and social and political activism, and fully embraces Turkish nationalism—the defining characteristic of which is Islam, not nationality—and economic neoliberalism while stressing continuity with Turkey's Ottoman past. His emphasis on the role of the state and neoliberalism are legacies of the changing nature of the late Ottoman state from the vantage point of the east, including conflicts between Muslims and Christians in Yugoslavia and, later, the expansion of the Soviet Union and the threat it posed.

The Ottoman Empire was an influential global power which, at its peak, controlled the Balkans and most of the modern-day Middle East. Neo-Ottomanist foreign policy encourages increased engagement in these regions as part of Turkey's growing regional influence. This foreign policy contributed to an improvement in Turkey's relations with its neighbors, particularly with Iraq, Iran and Syria. However Turkey's relations with Israel, once Turkey's ally, suffered, especially after the 2008–09 Gaza War and the 2010 Gaza flotilla raid.

Ahmet Davutoğlu, Turkish foreign minister from 2009 to 2014 and "head architect" of the new foreign policy, has, however, rejected the term "neo-Ottomanism" to describe his country's new foreign policy.

Turkey's new foreign policy started a debate, principally in the Western media, as to whether Turkey is undergoing an "axis shift"; in other words whether it is drifting away from the West and heading towards the Middle East and Asia. Such fears appear more frequently in Western media when Turkish tensions with Israel rise. Then-President Abdullah Gül dismissed claims that Turkey has shifted its foreign policy axis.

Davutoğlu worked to define Turkey's new foreign policy on the principle of "zero problems with neighbours", as opposed to Neo-Ottomanism. "Soft power" is regarded as particularly useful.

Focused on the rhetoric of the encounter between civilizations, Davutoğlu takes up the approach of former President Turgut Özal, who was the first Turkish president to begin discussions on Turkey's accession to the West. The latter put an end to the crisis that arose following the 1974 coup in Cyprus in order to move closer to the Western bloc, and thus to look towards Asia and extend its area of influence towards the countries of the Caucasus. Aiming at a policy of national harmony, Özal refuses any denial of specificity among Turkish citizens. He sought in particular to relaunch dialogue with the Kurds, wishing to put an end to the permanent state of war between the PKK and the Turkish state, a conflict which tarnished Turkey's image in the world.

As President, Erdoğan has overseen a revival of Ottoman tradition. While serving as the Prime Minister of Turkey, Erdoğan's AKP made references to the Ottoman era during election campaigns, such as calling their supporters 'grandsons of Ottomans' (Osmanlı torunu). This proved controversial, since it was perceived to be an open attack against the republican nature of modern Turkey founded by Mustafa Kemal Atatürk. In 2015, Erdoğan made a statement in which he endorsed the old Ottoman term külliye to refer to university campuses rather than the standard Turkish word kampüs. Many critics have thus accused Erdoğan of wanting to become an Ottoman sultan and abandon the secular and democratic credentials of the Republic. The American philosopher, Noam Chomsky, said that "Erdogan in Turkey is basically trying to create something like the Ottoman Caliphate, with him as caliph, supreme leader, throwing his weight around all over the place, and destroying the remnants of democracy in Turkey at the same time".

When pressed on this issue in January 2015, Erdoğan rejected these claims and told TRT that he would aim to fill a role more similar to Queen Elizabeth II of the United Kingdom, explaining, "In my opinion, even the UK is a semi-presidency. And the dominant element is the Queen".

In July 2020, after the Council of State annulled the Cabinet's 1934 decision to establish the Hagia Sophia as museum and revoking the monument's status, Erdoğan ordered its reclassification as a mosque. The 1934 decree was ruled to be unlawful under both Ottoman and Turkish law as Hagia Sophia's waqf, endowed by Sultan Mehmed II, had designated the site a mosque; proponents of the decision argued the Hagia Sophia was the personal property of the sultan. This redesignation is controversial, invoking condemnation from the Turkish opposition, UNESCO, the World Council of Churches, the Holy See, and many other international leaders. In August 2020, he also signed the order that transferred the administration of the Chora Church to the Directorate of Religious Affairs to open it for worship as a mosque. Initially converted to a mosque by the Ottomans, the building had then been designated as a museum by the government since 1934.

August 26, 2020, Turkish President Recep Tayyip Erdogan gave a speech, saying that "in our civilization, conquest is not occupation or looting. It is establishing the dominance of the justice that Allah commanded in the region. First of all, our nation removed the oppression from the areas that it conquered. It established justice. This is why our civilization is one of conquest. Turkey will take what is its right in the Mediterranean Sea, in the Aegean Sea, and in the Black Sea.

See also
Irredentism
Misak-ı Millî
Taksim (politics)
Pax Ottomana
Turkish fear
Kemalism
Blue Homeland
Vision 2023
Aegean dispute
Pan-Turkism
Turkish nationalism
Turkish invasion of Cyprus
Turkish occupation of northern Syria

References

Further reading
Prasanna Aditya, ‘Neo-Ottomanism’ in Turkish foreign policy, Observer Research Foundation, 2020. 
Kubilay Yado Arin, The AKP's Foreign Policy, Turkey's Reorientation from the West to the East?, Wissenschaftlicher Verlag Berlin, Berlin 2013. ISBN 9 783865 737199.
Florian Calian, The Hagia Sophia and Turkey’s Neo-Ottomanism, The Armenian Weekly, 2021. 
Stephanos Constantinides, Turkey: The Emergence of a New Foreign Policy The Neo-Ottoman Imperial Model, Journal of Political and Military Sociology,1996. 
Graham E. Fuller, The New Turkish Republic: Turkey as a Pivotal State in the Muslim World, United States Institute of Peace Press, 2007. 
Marwa Maziad, Jake Sotiriadis, Turkey’s Dangerous New Exports:  Pan-Islamist, Neo-Ottoman Visions and Regional Instability, Middle East Institute, 2020.
Alexander Murinson, Turkish Foreign Policy in the 21st Century: Neo-Ottomanism and the Strategic Depth Doctrine. I. B. Tauris, 2020. 
Darko Tanasković, Neo-ottomanism: A Doctrine and Foreign Policy Practice. Association of Non-Governmental Organisations of Southeast Europe-CIVIS, 2013. 

Arestakes Simavoryan, Ideological Trends in the Context of Foreign Policy of Turkey. Europe & Orient, no. 11 (55-62), 2010.
Miloš Todorović, TİKA’s Heritage Restoration Projects: Examples of Foreign Aid or Proof of Neo-Ottomanism?. Insight Turkey, no. 23/3 (141-156), 2021.
Hakan Yavuz, Nostalgia for the Empire: The Politics of Neo-Ottomanism. Oxford University Press, Oxford, 2020. .

Politics of Turkey
Foreign relations of Turkey
Political movements in Turkey
Political ideologies
Justice and Development Party (Turkey)
Recep Tayyip Erdoğan
Ottoman Empire
Islamism